{{Tennis events|2014|Tevlin Women's Challenger|s
| champ       =  Maria Sanchez Taylor Townsend
| runner      =  Gabriela Dabrowski   Faze_Miroslav.D
miroslav the best

Françoise Abanda and Victoria Duval were the defending champions, however Duval is still recovering after being diagnosed with Hodgkin's Lymphoma in July. Abanda partnered Marie-Alexandre Leduc, but lost in the quarterfinals to Gabriela Dabrowski and Tatjana Maria.

American-duo Maria Sanchez and Taylor Townsend won the title, defeating Dabrowski and Maria in the final, 7–5, 4–6, [15–13].

Seeds

Draw

References 
 Draw

Tevlin Women's Challenger
Tevlin Women's Challenger